Bealsville, originally named Howell's Creek, is an unincorporated community in southeastern Hillsborough County, Florida,  United States, between Plant City and Lithia near the intersection of Horton Road and Florida State Road 60.

History
Bealsville was founded after the civil war by freed slaves from surrounding communities including Knights, Plant City, Hopewell, and others. The 1866 Southern Homestead Act provided a means for freed slaves to obtain tracts of property ranging from 40 to 160 acres. To retain title, the new owners had to develop homes, clear land, and demonstrate that they possessed the equipment to farm it.

Education
The community of Bealsville is served by Hillsborough County Schools.

References

Unincorporated communities in Hillsborough County, Florida
Unincorporated communities in Florida